Officers is a Soviet drama film, shot at the Gorky Film Studio (Central Film Studio for Children named after Maxim Gorky) in 1971 by director Vladimir Rogovoy.

The premiere of the movie took place in the Soviet Union July 26, 1971. At the box office the film attracted about 53.4 million viewers.

Plot
The film depicts the fate of two friends - Aleksey Trofimov and Ivan Varavva - traced for many years. In the 20s, they serve together on the frontier, where they fight with the anti revolution bands. There they are, while still very young, remembered for a lifetime наказ своего командира: There is such a profession — to defend the homeland. After Spain, the Great Patriotic War, and peaceful days. Old friends meet again, have become generals.

Cast
 Georgi Yumatov as Aleksey Trofimov
 Vasily Lanovoy as Ivan Varavva
 Alina Pokrovskaya as Lyubov Trofimova
 Aleksandr Voevodin as Georgy Trofimov
 Vladimir Druzhnikov as Georgi Petrovich, squadron commander
 Yevgeny Vesnik as paramedic
 Valery Ryzhakov as Yury Sergeyev, Guard Captain
 Shamuhammed Akmuhammedov as Kerim
 Muza Krepkogorskaya as Anna Vasilyevna

Awards
  Soviet Screen Award — best actor (Vasily Lanovoy) 
 Prize and diploma of the Czechoslovak Workers Film Festival

References

External links
 
 «Офицеры» на сайте «Кино России» at the Wayback Machine

1971 films
1970s Russian-language films
1970s war drama films
Soviet war drama films
Russian war drama films
Soviet black-and-white films
Films based on works by Boris Vasilyev
Films about the Soviet Union in the Stalin era
Russian Civil War films
Spanish Civil War films
Eastern Front of World War II films
Films set in Central Asia
Films set in the Republic of China (1912–1949)
Films set in Russia
Films shot in Crimea
Films shot in Moscow
Films shot in Moscow Oblast
Films shot in Turkmenistan
Gorky Film Studio films
Films based on Russian novels
1971 drama films
Russian black-and-white films
Russian World War II films
Soviet World War II films